The Fox Bruin Theater is a 670-seat movie palace located in the Westwood neighborhood of Los Angeles, California, near University of California, Los Angeles (UCLA).

History 
The Bruin is located in the heart of the Mediterranean-themed Westwood Village shopping and cinema precinct, opposite the prominent white tower of the Fox Village Theater. The structure was designed by movie theater architect, S. Charles Lee, with a Streamline Moderne marquee, and opened in 1937. It is named after the UCLA mascot Joe Bruin. It is currently operated by Regency Theatres. The theater is often used for private events, such as film and television show premieres.  

It was designated a Los Angeles Historic-Cultural Monument (HCM #361) in 1988.

In popular culture 
The theater featured in the music video of "Praise You" by Fatboy Slim and was animated in Grand Theft Auto V as well, as the Tivoli Cinema. It was prominently featured in Quentin Tarantino's film Once Upon a Time in Hollywood, in which actress Sharon Tate (portrayed by Margot Robbie in the movie) is shown watching the film The Wrecking Crew.

References

Cinemas and movie theaters in Los Angeles
Movie palaces
Westwood, Los Angeles
Los Angeles Historic-Cultural Monuments
Art Deco architecture in California
Event venues established in 1937
Theatres completed in 1937
1937 establishments in California
Streamline Moderne architecture in California